The IMOCA 60 Class yacht SILL PLEIN FRUIT, FRA 29 was designed by Marc Lombard and launched in the 1999 after being built MAG based in France. The boat was lost in 2006 Velux 5 Ocean Race, when he was rescued by fellow competitor Mike Golding deep in the Southern Ocean. The written off hull was found nine years later washed up, 10,000 miles from where it was abandoned.

Racing results

References

Individual sailing vessels
1990s sailing yachts
Sailing yachts designed by Marc Lombard
Vendée Globe boats
IMOCA 60